Jin Mengqing (金梦青, born 29 May 1995) is a Chinese handball player for Jiangsu Handball and the Chinese national team.

She competed at the 2015 World Women's Handball Championship in Denmark.

References

1995 births
Living people
Chinese female handball players